James F. Cockerell was a collector of specimens for zoölogists, active in Australia, Indonesia, and Pacific Islands, after 1867. He provided collections for the South Australian Museum after the 1880s, while residing at Mildura, Victoria.

An expedition made to the Solomon Islands in 1878 produced specimens that resulted in the descriptions of the birds made by Edward P. Ramsay between 1879 and 1882. Part of this collection is held at the Australian Museum, and the rest was acquired by six other museums. James Cockerell visited Western Australia from 1879 to early 1880, and the bird skins that he collected were acquired by the British Museum. Further collections were made in Aru Islands in 1872, Samoa, Fiji and the Bismarks, 1875–1876.

The Handbook of the Birds of the World Alive 'Key to Scientific Names' notes possible biographical details as "(1844?–1897) Australian (born in Hong Kong?)" and a middle name of Frederick.

His father, John T. Cockerell (1828?–1907), also worked as a collector.

References 

19th-century births
Year of death missing
Zoological collectors